The Word was an individualist anarchist free love magazine founded in 1872. The magazine was edited by Ezra Heywood and Angela Heywood from 1872–1890, 1892–1893, issued first from Princeton and then from Cambridge, Massachusetts. The Word was subtitled "A Monthly Journal of Reform," and it included contributions from Josiah Warren, Benjamin Tucker, and Joshua K. Ingalls. Initially, The Word presented free love as a minor theme which was expressed within a labor reform format. But the publication later evolved into an explicitly free love periodical.  At some point Tucker became an important contributor but later became dissatisfied with the journal's focus on free love since he desired a concentration on economics. The magazine existed until 1893.

References

1872 establishments in Massachusetts
1893 disestablishments in the United States
Monthly magazines published in the United States
Anarcha-feminism
Anarchism and free love
Anarchist periodicals published in the United States
Defunct political magazines published in the United States
Feminism in the United States
Feminist magazines
Free love advocates
Individualist anarchist publications
Magazines established in 1872
Magazines disestablished in 1893
Magazines published in Boston